Identification with the Enemy: A Key to the Underworld is the eighth studio album by the Italian band Zu, in collaboration with Japanese musician Nobukazu Takemura, released in 2007.

Track list
 Alone with the Alone (4:58)
 The Culprit (5:06)
 Standing on This Zero Spot (2:43)
 New Buddhas in Stock (1:33)
 Usual conversations with Yama (12:04)
 Awake in the Next Room (2:38)
 Everyone Gets His Own Nemesis (4:01)
 Deliver Me From the Book of Self (7:40)

Line Up
 Luca T. Mai / baritone sax
 Jacopo Battaglia / drums, electronics
 Massimo Pupillo / bass
 Nobukazu Takemura / electronics

References

2007 albums
Zu (band) albums